On 26 August 2012, a double-decker sleeper bus crashed into a tanker in northern China, near the city of Yan'an in the Shaanxi province.  The tanker was loaded with highly flammable methanol.  36 people were killed.

The accident was the deadliest in China since the 2011 Xinyang bus fire, when a fire in an overcrowded sleeper bus containing flammable material killed 41 people.

The crash
On 26 August 2012, a tanker returned to the highway following an early-morning rest stop.  Meanwhile, a double-decker sleeper bus carrying 39 people left Hohhot, in Inner Mongolia, and headed south to Xi'an.

The tanker was rear-ended by the bus at approximately 2:00 a.m. on the Baotou-Maoming motorway in north China.

The tanker was loaded with highly flammable methanol, causing the tanker and bus to explode in flames.  Thirty-six people were killed in the crash, partly due to the fact that many of the passengers were sleeping at the time of the explosion. Three people survived the crash but were hospitalized with injuries.

Identification of victims
On 5 September 2012, the Public security bureau of Ansai District announced that it had confirmed the identities of 35 of those killed, with one male victim being unidentified.

Investigation
Following pictures of safety official Yang Dacai depicting him grinning at the scene of the crash, Chinese officials have launched an investigation into Yang, although Yang said he was simply trying to cheer people.  Web users have been outraged at the pictures, and some web users discovered pictures of Yang wearing wrist watches which cost over $40,000, and demanded an investigation into Yang's behavior.  However, Yang has said that he "used legal income" to buy these watches. Nonetheless, he was later stripped of all his official duties for "serious wrongdoing" amid reports that officials were also investigating other trails of "wrongdoing."
He was later jailed for 14 years on charges of bribery and possessing a large amount of funds on unclear grounds.

References

Explosions in 2012
2012 disasters in China
2012 road incidents
Explosions in China
History of Shaanxi
Road incidents in China
Bus incidents in China
Tanker explosions
Yan'an
August 2012 events in China